The Palm Beach Currumbin Australian Football Club is an Australian rules football club on the Gold Coast, Queensland. The club emblem is the lion and the club plays in both Division One and Division Two of the AFL Queensland State League.
	
Palm Beach won the 1999 premiership.

History
The Central Australian Football Club was established in 1961 and was one of the founding clubs of the Gold Coast Australian Football League. By 1965 the club had captured its first GCAFL premiership and would later change its name to the Palm Beach Currumbin Australian Football Club.

Premierships (13)

Drafted players in the AFL

Notable players 
 Wayne Carey (Adelaide and North Melbourne)
 Liam Jones (Carlton and Western Bulldogs)
 Michael Rischitelli (Brisbane Lions and Gold Coast)

References

External links
PBCAFC - Palm Beach Currumbin Australian Football Club Inc. Website

Palm Beach Currumbin
Currumbin, Queensland
Australian rules football clubs established in 1961
1961 establishments in Australia
Australian rules football teams on the Gold Coast, Queensland